opened in Nara, Japan in 1973. The collection numbers some 4,100 items and special exhibitions are also held.

See also
 Yamato Bunkakan
 Nara National Museum
 List of Cultural Properties of Japan - paintings (Nara)

References

External links
  Nara Prefectural Museum of Art
 Nara Prefectural Museum at Google Cultural Institute

Museums in Nara, Nara
Art museums and galleries in Japan
Museums established in 1973
1973 establishments in Japan